Upperthorpe and Killamarsh was a railway station that served the villages of Killamarsh and Upperthorpe in Derbyshire, England. It was one of three stations serving Killamarsh. The station was on the Sheffield District Railway which ran between Sheffield Victoria and Shirebrook North on the Lancashire, Derbyshire and East Coast Railways network of lines in the region.

History

Opening and operation
The station was opened on the Beighton Branch of the Lancashire, Derbyshire and East Coast Railway (LD&ECR) in 1898. The LD&ECR wished to extend into Sheffield using the MS&LR's lines but was rebuffed, and instead joined the Midland's line at Beighton Junction. From there it went on to join the Sheffield District Railway at Treeton Junction and thereby gain access to goods traffic in central Sheffield and to the Midland Railway's  station.

Closure
The station closed in 1930. The line itself closed to stopping passenger services on the outbreak of World War II in 1939. In the late 1980s the station site was home to a short-lived railway preservation attempt known as the Rother Valley Railway. This was formally abandoned in 1992, and the preservationists' energy and commitment were transferred to the Cleethorpes Coast Light Railway.

Today 
The station fell into disuse after closure and the track on the line was completely lifted in the 1980s when the nearby Westthorpe Colliery closed. The Station Master's house on Field Lane is now a private dwelling and has no connection to the old platforms, which themselves have been demolished along with any other traces of the station. The cutting of the old line is now very overgrown and neglected with refuse; many efforts have been made to restrict access to the site through the use of fences.

References

Notes

Sources

Further reading

External links
Upperthorpe & Killamarsh station, looking South in Killamarsh
Closed station on old OS maps with modern overlay in National Library of Scotland
The station and line on OS maps with modern overlay in Rail Map Online
The station and line WEC2, with mileages in Railway Codes

Disused railway stations in Derbyshire
Former Lancashire, Derbyshire and East Coast Railway stations
Railway stations in Great Britain opened in 1898
Railway stations in Great Britain closed in 1930